Islamabad Express is a passenger train operated daily by Pakistan Railways between Lahore and Islamabad. The train named after the capital city of Pakistan, Islamabad.

History
The train began service on 8 September 2004 with Chinese rakes.

Route
 Lahore Junction–Golra Sharif Junction via Karachi–Peshawar Railway Line
 Golra Sharif Junction–Islamabad via Islamabad Rail Link

Halts 
 Lahore Junction
 Chaklala
 Rawalpindi
 Islamabad

Equipment
The train has AC Parlour, AC Lower and economy accommodations.

References 

Named passenger trains of Pakistan
Passenger trains in Pakistan